Ortley may refer to:

Ortley (apple), an apple cultivar
Ortley, Oregon, a former town in Wasco County
Ortley, South Dakota, a town in Roberts County
Dover Beaches South, New Jersey, commonly known as Ortley Beach